Ivan Nagy (28 April 194322 February 2014) was a Hungarian ballet dancer.

He became one of American Ballet Theatre's most popular stars in the 1970s as an acclaimed partner to great ballerinas.

Nagy was born in Debrecen, Hungary on 28 April 1943. He was trained in Budapest by Soviet-influenced teachers before he defected to the United States in 1965. He was sent to the International Ballet Competition in Varna, Bulgaria, where he won a silver medal.

Nagy met his wife, the Australian ballerina Marilyn Burr, at the National Ballet. After three years with the National Ballet, Nagy danced for one season, in 1968, with the New York City Ballet.  By July 1968, he had moved to Ballet Theater, where he established partnerships with Natalia Makarova, Gelsey Kirkland and Cynthia Gregory, and on tour with Dame Margot Fonteyn.  Nagy retired from Ballet Theater at the age of 35 in 1978. Makarova was especially disappointed as he was a favorite partner of hers. She remarked, "It is a great loss. Ivan is in top form. He is quitting far too soon."

In 1980, he embarked on a second career as an artistic director of the Ballet de Santiago in Chile from 1982 to 1986 and artistic director of the Cincinnati/New Orleans Ballet from 1986 to 1989. From 1990 to 1993, he was artistic director of the English National Ballet before returning to the Ballet de Santiago for several years. In his final year he worked as artistic adviser to the Hungarian State Opera House Ballet.

He lived with his wife in Valldemossa, on the island of Majorca. He did pay a visit to guest-teach at Gelsey Kirkland's School of Classical Ballet.

Nagy died on 22 February 2014 while visiting a cousin in Budapest.  He was aged 70.  He was survived by his wife, two daughters and a granddaughter.

References

1943 births
2014 deaths
Hungarian male ballet dancers
American male ballet dancers
20th-century American ballet dancers